Bišumuiža is a neighbourhood of Zemgale Suburb in Riga, the capital of Latvia.

External links

 

Neighbourhoods in Riga